Adrift is a 2009 Brazilian drama film directed by Heitor Dhalia, starring Laura Neiva, Camilla Belle and Vincent Cassel. It competed in the Un Certain Regard section at the 2009 Cannes Film Festival.

Plot
The film tells about Filipa (Laura Neiva), a 14-year-old girl who spends her holidays with her family in the town of Búzios, in Rio de Janeiro. While she discovers herself, facing passions and common challenges of adolescence, Filipa also has to deal with the extramarital relationship that her father, Matias (Vincent Cassel), has with Ângela (Camilla Belle), a neighbor of his beach house.

Cast
 Laura Neiva as Filipa
 Vincent Cassel as Matias
 Camilla Belle as Ângela
 Débora Bloch as Clarice
 Gregório Duvivier as Lucas
 Max Huzar as Antônio
 Izadora Armelin as Fernanda
 Cauã Reymond as Barman

References

External links
 
 

2009 films
2009 drama films
2000s Portuguese-language films
Brazilian drama films
Films shot in Rio de Janeiro (city)
Films directed by Heitor Dhalia
Films scored by Antônio Pinto